This is a list of Inter players who have been inducted into the club's Hall of Fame.

History and regulations
Inter's Hall of Fame was launched in 2018 as a yearly competition as part of the initiatives for the club's 110th anniversary. To be eligible, players must have made at least 60 competitive appearances for Inter, have won at least one trophy with Inter, and have been retired for at least three years. 

In the first two editions (2018 and 2019), fans decide through electronic voting four shortlisted players, one for each position (goalkeeper, defender, midfielder and forward). Then, four winners were decided (a goalkeeper, a defender, a midfielder and a forward) among three candidates from each position through the votes from:
national and international media;
players from all of the Inter teams, from the Pulcini to the First Team.
from Inter employees and collaborators;
from existing Hall of Famers once they've been elected.

Since the 2020 edition, the shortlist has been scrapped and the four winners are directly determined through voting from fans, the players from all of Inter’s teams, club employees, players inducted into previous editions of the Hall of Fame, and representatives from the main national and international newspapers.

Also since the 2020 edition, branded as Timeless Edition to celebrate the tenth anniversary of the treble, retired Inter players of the 2009–10 season have started to be eligible – even if they had not been retired for at least three years.

List of Hall of Fame players
Nationality column refers to the country (countries) represented internationally by the player, if any.

Special award

List of candidates
The 2018 and 2019 editions of the Hall of Fame saw the creation of a shortlist of four players, one per role, decided through fans' votes. Since the 2020 edition, the shortlist is no longer in use.

2018
Goalkeepers: Francesco Toldo, Gianluca Pagliuca, Walter Zenga
Defenders: Giuseppe Bergomi, Giacinto Facchetti, Javier Zanetti
Midfielders: Sandro Mazzola, Lothar Matthäus, Dejan Stanković
Forwards: Giuseppe Meazza, Ronaldo, Alessandro Altobelli
2019
Goalkeepers: Gianluca Pagliuca, Giuliano Sarti, Francesco Toldo
Defenders: Giuseppe Bergomi, Giacinto Facchetti, Marco Materazzi
Midfielders: Nicola Berti, Sandro Mazzola, Dejan Stanković
Forwards: Giuseppe Meazza, Christian Vieri, Alessandro Altobelli

See also
List of Inter Milan players (100+ appearances)
List of Inter Milan players (25–99 appearances)

References

External links
Inter Milan Hall of Fame at Inter.it

Hall of Fame
Halls of fame in Italy